William Arthur Blacklock (17 July 1883 – 8 July 1942) was an Australian rules footballer who played with Fitzroy in the Victorian Football League (VFL).

Notes

External links 

1883 births
1942 deaths
Australian rules footballers from Victoria (Australia)
Fitzroy Football Club players